Tornado (1996) is a children's book by Betsy Byars, illustrated by Doron Ben-Ami.

Plot
To calm the fears of his boss's sons as they wait out a tornado in a storm cellar, Pete tells some well-worn stories of his childhood dog, Tornado: how he arrived intact in his doghouse during another tornado; how he could do a card trick; how he met the cat Five-Thirty; how he was reunited with his previous owners. Other stories will have to wait for another storm.

1996 American novels
American children's novels
Children's novels about animals
1996 children's books